Laratt is a surname, and may refer to:

 Devon Larratt (b. 1975), Canadian professional armwrestler
 Shannon Larratt (1973–2013), Canadian publisher, creator and editor of BME, a body-modification enthusiast online magazine